Longkan Shoujian is a Chinese dictionary compiled during the Liao dynasty by the Khitan monk Xingjun. The earliest surviving edition of the work is an incomplete Korean one, reprinted in China in 1985.

Longkan Shoujian was one of the many Buddhist yinyishu ('dictionary of pronunciations and meanings') produced in ancient China, which were meant to aid the study of Buddhist scriptures. However, the work stands out in two aspects. Firstly, its method of collation is innovative. While Chinese dictionaries before Shoujian collate characters either graphically (by radical) or phonetically (by tone and rime), the work employs both methods: the radicals, which number 242 (including the "radical" za ('miscellaneous'), where characters that are difficult to analyze graphically are found), are grouped by tone into four groups (each group occupies one juan or fascicle); the characters under each radical are in turn grouped by tone. Secondly, it collects more than 26,000 characters with a huge proportion of variant characters. Many of these variants are not recorded in any other works.

The characters in it are divided, in terms of orthography, into "standard" (zheng), "vulgar" (su), "contemporary" (jin), "archaic" (gu) and "alternative" (huozuo), a classification more elaborated than that used in Ganlu Zishu. The pronunciations of characters in it are indicated by either homophone or fanqie spelling. For some characters, only the pronunciations are given, not the meanings.

While being criticized for its unorthodox collation and collection by the Qing philologists, it is hailed by Pan (1980) as an essential guide for deciphering the Dunhuang manuscripts, which contains a large amount of "vulgar" characters.

References
Pan Chonggui 潘重規 (ed.) (1980). Longkan shoujian xinbian (龍龕手鑑新編 "Longkan shoujian, a reorganized edition"). Taipei: Shimen tushu gongsi.
Shi Xingjun 釋行均 (2006[1985]). Longkan shoujing (Gaoli ben) (龍龕手鏡 (高麗本) "The handy mirror in the dragon shrine (Korean edition)"). Beijing: Zhonghua Book Company. .
Zhongguo da baike quanshu. First Edition. Beijing; Shanghai: Zhongguo da baike quanshu chubanshe. 1980–1993.

External links
 木村正辭, 龍龕手鑑 (including references to the work in other Chinese texts)

Chinese dictionaries
Khitan history
10th-century Chinese books